Raines is a seven-episode American police procedural television show starring Jeff Goldblum as a police detective who hallucinates the victims whose murders he is investigating.  Created by Graham Yost, the series was short-lived, airing in spring 2007 and garnering mixed reviews.

Premise
Michael Raines (Goldblum) is a police detective who investigates murders.  With the series premiere, Raines is returning to work after recovering from a shootout that killed his partner, Charlie Lincoln (Malik Yoba).  Over the course of each episode, Raines involuntarily hallucinates the victims, whom he speaks to and uses as sounding boards for his case; as Raines learns more about the dead, the apparitions he sees change duly.  Once Raines solves their murders, the hallucinations disappear.  Creator and executive producer Graham Yost found the analogous premise of Raines in his own creative process: "I spend time alone in a room, thinking of characters and interacting with them. And I'll talk a dialogue in my head."

Variety categorized the show as "a throwback to the 1970s — a single-lead detective show that neatly wraps up whodunit each hour."

Episodes
Zap2it shows that seven episodes of Raines aired from March 15April 27, 2007.

Production
Raines was filmed in Los Angeles by NBC Universal Television Studio.  Graham Yost was the executive producer, joined by Félix Enríquez Alcalá and Fred Golan.  Preston Fischer produced while Frank Darabont was credited with directing.  NBC ceased production after seven episodes.

Cast

Yost cast Jeff Goldblum as Michael Raines, homicide detective and Raymond Chandler fan who, like Chandler's Philip Marlowe, "hides a tender heart beneath cynical gibes and sarcastic asides."  Media Life called the choice ideal, what with Goldblum's "unconventional looks, mannerisms and vocal style."

Malik Yoba was cast as Charlie Lincoln, Raines' partner who died before the show began; whereas he once kept his eccentric partner grounded, now Raines hallucinates his presence and continues to rely on his assistance.

Madeleine Stowe plays Dr. Samantha Kohl, a psychiatrist unenviably tasked with helping Raines cope with the loss of his partner and subsequent hallucinations.

Rounding out Raines cast are:
 Matt Craven as Captain Daniel Lewis
 Dov Davidoff as Remi Boyer
 Linda Park as Michelle Lance
 Nicole Sullivan as Carolyn Crumley

Release and cancellation
On December 21, 2006, Australia's Network 10 secured the rights to broadcast Raines (and Friday Night Lights) in that nation. Raines was cancelled; in an interview after-the-fact, Goldblum only reflected that he was fortunate to have had the opportunity, especially as it led to his starring role in Law & Order: Criminal Intent.

Reception
David Bianculli broadly praised Raines, calling for NBC to renew the brand-new show after having seen only two episodes.  Media Life Andrew Lyons called Raines a fresh injection of film noir sensibilities into the world of "Bruckheimer quick cuts".  Comparing Raines to characters played by Humphrey Bogart and Robert Mitchum, Lyons called Yost's take successful.  For the New York Post, Raines was the only standout among the 2007 mid-season replacements that otherwise  with […] horrible writing, amateurish acting and plot lines that stink up the joint."  Linda Stasi described this cream of that crop as an amalgamation of other lasting serials such as Columbo, Medium, and Monk.  Invoking those same shows, USA Today Robert Bianco was pleased with the Goldblum vehicle, further lauding Yost's "fascination with the beauty and peculiarity of Los Angeles.  This is Raymond Chandler for the Age of Therapy."

Brian Lowry of Variety called Raines unremarkable in its field, with only Jeff Goldblum to distinguish it, conceding that his analysis also fit the popular shows House (with Hugh Laurie) and Monk (with Tony Shalhoub).  Lowry appreciated Raines eschewing mysticism in favor of Raines' acknowledged hallucinations.  The Toronto Star Vinay Menon similarly called Goldblum the show's driver, but that the performance "sometimes feels locked inside the wrong car."  Though the San Francisco Chronicle anticipated a quick cancellation for Raines for its predictability, pandering, and mediocrity, reviewer Tim Goodman nonetheless called it an "enjoyable time waster", praising Goldblum and the show's "crisp, darkly saturated visual style".  Alessandra Stanley thought Raines was an overly slavish homage to 1986's The Singing Detective; while she was uncertain about the hallucination gimmick—noting that most television detectives have been strong men with faults (e.g. Kojak with his lollipop or Ironside in his wheelchair)—Stanley felt Raines was trying to be too much and was muddled therefor.  She did recommend allowing Goldblum's new vehicle to find its feet, though, much like House, Boston Legal, and Shark did.

Scott D. Pierce of the Deseret News found Raines to simply be a boring, "fairly standard detective show" that cribbed from other, more-successful programs like The Sopranos.  Ellen Gray wrote in The Philadelphia Inquirer that the well-trod hallucinating character trope only served to make Raines an unappealing character to audiences, and this failing central tenet of the show doomed it from the start.

See also

References

External links
 
 

2000s American police procedural television series
2007 American television series debuts
2007 American television series endings
English-language television shows
NBC original programming
Television about mental health
Television series by Universal Television
Television shows filmed in Los Angeles
Television shows set in Los Angeles